Dendrodrilus rubidus is a species of earthworm in the family Lumbricidae. It is native to Europe, and it is a widespread introduced species, occurring on every continent except Antarctica, as well as many islands. It is often invasive. It is sometimes used as fishing bait, and is marketed under many nonspecific names, including red wiggler, jumping red wiggler, red trout worm, jumbo red worm, and pink worm. Other common names include bank worm, tree worm, and gilt tail.

Description
This earthworm is 2 to 10 centimeters long and dark red in color with a yellowish or orange tail end.

Habitat
This is an epigeic species, one which occurs on the soil surface in leaf litter and in the top layers of the soil, up to 10 centimeters deep. It prefers substrates rich in organic material, such as rotting wood and other plant matter, compost, peat, and manure. It occurs in many habitat types. It is common in the coniferous forests of its native range, and in cultivated soils. In North America it is often found in biological surveys of caves. It inhabits the organic soils of the nest mounds of the red wood ant (Formica aquilonia) in the forests of Finland, and it may help to keep the nests free of fungi. This earthworm is tolerant of soils with high levels of heavy metals and toxic semimetals. It has been observed in mine spoils contaminated with arsenic and in nickel- and copper-contaminated soils near smelting operations. It also tolerates acidic conditions, allowing it to thrive in the acidic litter of conifers.

Biology
The species has a high rate of reproduction, and can complete its life cycle in 75 days. There are morphs that reproduce sexually and by parthenogenesis, producing young without fertilization.

While the worms themselves are sensitive to cold temperatures, the cocoons are very cold-hardy. They can stay viable over the winter in temperatures below −40 °C. In an experiment, 50% of a sample of cocoons kept at the temperature of liquid nitrogen (−196 °C) for 24 hours still had viable embryos. Their ability to survive such cold comes from their very low water content and the presence of cryoprotectant compounds such as sorbitol. In cold climates the adults die off and the cocoons overwinter, a new generation emerging when temperatures rise.

As an invasive species
This is one of many European earthworms that are now familiar worldwide as introduced and sometimes invasive species. For example, the Upper Midwest region of the United States has no native earthworms today, the last native taxa having been extirpated during the Ice Age. With European settlers came European earthworm species such as D. rubidus, which now make up the local earthworm fauna. A similar pattern occurred on parts of the Russian Plain, which has a few native earthworms and many introduced species. D. rubidus and other exotic epigeic earthworms are considered invasive because they alter the composition and stratification of the leaf litter on the forest floor as they consume it; this alters the ecosystems involved with the various soil horizons, a change which has a cascading effect through other ecosystems.

One common way this species spreads is through the release of bait worms into the habitat. It is a "nightcrawler", an earthworm used as fishing bait, and one of several species sold in American bait shops as "red wigglers". It can often be found in shipments of worms labelled as another species, such as Lumbricus terrestris or L. rubellus. Bait worms are commonly lost and dumped in the habitat on fishing trips; sites of invasive populations are often near lakes. Exotic earthworms in general are also introduced when the cocoons are transported on vehicles and machinery, in ballast, and on the water itself.

There are no good control methods for exotic earthworms that do not have the potential to affect other organisms, so prevention of introductions is more important.

See also
 Earthworms as invasive species
 Dendrobaena attemsi.

References

Lumbricidae
Taxa named by Marie Jules César Savigny
Animals described in 1826